Cabanaconde or Qhawana Kunti (Quechua) is one of twenty districts of the  Caylloma Province in Peru.

Geography 
Other mountains are listed below:

Images

See also 
 Chila mountain range
 Muyurqa Lake

References

External links
 http://worldtimer.net/Cities/all.php?c=Peru&city=Cabanaconde&country=&k1=-1562&k2=-7198 Time, Weather and Astronomical Data for Cabanaconde.

Districts of the Caylloma Province
Districts of the Arequipa Region